The 1914 South Dakota gubernatorial election was held on November 3, 1914. Despite a close election in 1912, incumbent Republican Governor Frank M. Byrne defeated Democratic nominee James W. McCarter, an Edmunds County Judge, with 50.07% of the vote. Coincidently, Bryne's Democratic opponent in 1912, Edwin S. Johnson, was elected the same year to represent South Dakota in the United States Senate.

Primary elections
The state Primary elections were held on March 24, 1914.

Democratic primary

Candidates
James W. McCarter, Edmunds County Judge

Results

Republican primary

Candidates
Frank M. Byrne, incumbent Governor
 H. B. Anderson, State Auditor
 Richard Olsen Richards, perennial candidate for office

Results

Prohibition primary

Candidates
C. K. Thompson

Results

Socialist primary

Candidates
John C. Knapp

Results

General election

Candidates
James W. McCarter, Democratic
Frank M. Byrne, Republican
Richard Olsen Richards, Independent
C. K. Thompson, Prohibition
John C. Knapp, Socialist

Results

References

Bibliography
 

1914
South Dakota
Gubernatorial
November 1914 events